Mary Fraser Wesselhoeft (February 15, 1873 – March 23, 1971) was an American graphic artist, watercolorist, and stained-glass artist.

Life 
Mary Wesselhoeft was born in Boston, Massachusetts.

She graduated from the School of the Museum of Fine Arts, studying under Denman Ross and Charles Herbert Woodbury in Boston. Wesselhoeft also later studied under Hugo von Habermann in Munich.

Wesselhoeft worked in Cambridge, Massachusetts; New York City, New York; and Santa Barbara, California. In 1900, she taught drawing at Miss Webster's Private School in Cambridge. By 1922, she had moved to New York City, where she set up a studio on Sixth Avenue and Eleventh Street. Her work was also part of the painting event in the art competition at the 1932 Summer Olympics.

Media/Style 

Wesselhoeft experimented with a variety of artistic medias, including: oils, watercolor, stained glass design, and crafting. As an American artist of the west, she is noted for her landscapes of Santa Barbara and of New Mexico, and portraits of Native Americans. Wesselhoeft created her glass works using both painted and unpainted glass, and is noted for her ecclesiastical designs. Wesselhoeft's stained-glass artwork was praised for its notoriety by the New York Times:"Something quite new in glass is being done by a young woman, Miss Mary Fraser Wesselhoeft... she is the first person as far as known who has attempted to put the so-called independent art into glass... Miss Wesselhoeft believes that the simplicity of line and strong contrast of color in the work of the modern artists lends themselves to reproduction in glass."

Exhibitions 

 Boston Art Club.
 California State Fair. 
 California Watercolor Society. 
 Chicago Art Institute, (date unknown). 
 Independent Show (date unknown). "The Flight Into Egypt." Glass.  
 New York Architectural League, 1922. 
 Salons of America. 
 Whitney Museum of American Art. 
 Whitney Studio Club, (date unknown). Exhibition of Water Colors - Thomas H. Donnelly, Richard Lahey, Richard Marwede, Mary F. Wesselhoeft & Designs for Stained Glass by Miss Wesselhoeft. November 28 - December 14.

Notable Works 
Stained glass window in the nave of the Grace and Holy Trinity Cathedral in Kansas City, Missouri, designed in 1912.

"Madam W.," drypoint, 1908. Smithsonian American Art Museum Collection.

Rose Window of the Unitarian Church, Santa Barbara, California.

"Portrait of Mrs. Perez Morton."

Memberships 
Wesselhoft was a member of various notable art societies:

 The American Artists Congress.
 The Copley Society of Art, the oldest non-profit art association in the United States, founded in 1879.
 The California Water Color Society (later known as the California National Watercolor Society (1967) and the National Watercolor Society (1975)).
 The Salons of America.
 The Santa Barbara Art Association.
 The Society of Independent Artists.

References 

1873 births
1971 deaths
19th-century American artists
20th-century American artists
American stained glass artists and manufacturers
Artists from Boston
School of the Museum of Fine Arts at Tufts alumni
Society of Independent Artists
Olympic competitors in art competitions
20th-century American women artists
19th-century American women